Bangladesh Chess Federation is the national federation for Chess and is responsible for governing the sport in Bangladesh. Benazir Ahmed is the President of Bangladesh Chess Federation. Syed Shahabuddin Shamim is the General Secretary of Bangladesh Chess Federation.

History
Bangladesh Chess Federation was founded by Qazi Motahar Hossain. Qazi Motahar Hossain was the founding president of All Pakistan National Chess Federation. After the Independence of Bangladesh, he founded the Bangladesh Daba Sangha. The Daba Sangha was re-organized into the Bangladesh Chess Federation, which was established in 1974. Qazi Motahar Hossain became the founding president of the Bangladesh Chess Federation. In 1985, Bangladesh Chess Federation started the annual Dr. Qazi Motahar Hossain International Masters Chess Tournament named after its founding president.

References

Chess in Bangladesh
National members of the Asian Chess Federation
1974 establishments in Bangladesh
Sports organizations established in 1974
Chess
Organisations based in Dhaka